Chhatarpur tehsil is a tehsil in chhatarpur district, Madhya Pradesh, India. It is also a subdivision of the administrative and revenue division of sagar district of Madhya Pradesh.

Demographics

References 

Tehsils of Madhya Pradesh
Chhatarpur district